Győri ETO FC is a professional football club based in Győr, Hungary.

Matches

Record by country of opposition
Correct as of 25 July 2014

P – Played; W – Won; D – Drawn; L – Lost

Records
As of 30 April 2018
Biggest win: 17/08/2010, Győr 10-0 Encamp, Gyor
Biggest defeat: 11/10/2017, Barcelona 7-0 Győr, Padova
Appearances in UEFA Futsal Cup:  7
Player with most UEFA appearances: 36 Ákos Harnisch
Top scorers in UEFA club competitions: 20 Zoltán Dróth

References

External links

Győri ETO FC
Hungarian football clubs in international competitions